The 1934 Rushcliffe by-election was held on 26 July 1934.  The by-election was held due to the resignation of the incumbent Conservative MP, Henry Betterton.  It was won by the Conservative candidate Ralph Assheton.

Candidates
The Liberal Party selected Arthur Thomas Marwood, who had been their candidate in the 1929 general election. He was a commercial traveller in the grocery trade. He lived locally, in Carlton. He had run a Baptist church.

Result

Aftermath
Marwood contested Derbyshire North East at the 1935 general election.

References

1934 elections in the United Kingdom
1934 in England
20th century in Nottinghamshire
By-elections to the Parliament of the United Kingdom in Nottinghamshire constituencies
July 1934 events